Nawaru, or Sirio, is a Papuan language. It is spoken in the village of Sibia in Namudi ward, Safia Rural LLG, Ijivitari District, Oro Province, in the "tail" of Papua New Guinea.

Nawaru is described by Ethnologue as "very similar" to Yareba.

References 

Languages of Papua New Guinea
Languages of Oro Province
Yareban languages